Norfolk City Hall, also known as the MacArthur Memorial, is a historic city hall located at Norfolk, Virginia. It was built in 1847, and is a two-story, stuccoed and granite faced, temple-form building measuring 80 feet by 60 feet. It features a front portico supported by six massive Tuscan order columns, and a gable roof topped by a cupola.  The building housed city offices until 1918, and courtrooms until 1960.

In 1961, the entire building interior was gutted to house the museum and tomb of General Douglas MacArthur and his wife. The MacArthur Memorial also includes a visitor center building and a research center.

Norfolk City Hall was listed on the National Register of Historic Places in 1972.

See also
 List of mayors of Norfolk, Virginia

References

External links
Norfolk City Hall & Courthouse, 421 East City Hall Avenue, Norfolk, Norfolk, VA: 1 photo, 25 data pages, and 1 photo caption page at Historic American Buildings Survey
MacArthur Memorial official website

Historic American Buildings Survey in Virginia
City and town halls on the National Register of Historic Places in Virginia
Government buildings completed in 1847
Buildings and structures in Norfolk, Virginia
National Register of Historic Places in Norfolk, Virginia
1847 establishments in Virginia
Douglas MacArthur
Downtown Norfolk, Virginia